Barto Bridge is a historic concrete arch bridge located at Washington Township in Berks County, Pennsylvania. It is a single span , concrete barrel arch bridge, constructed in 1908. It crosses a tributary of Perkiomen Creek.

It was listed on the National Register of Historic Places in 1988.

References 

Road bridges on the National Register of Historic Places in Pennsylvania
Bridges completed in 1908
Bridges in Berks County, Pennsylvania
1908 establishments in Pennsylvania
National Register of Historic Places in Berks County, Pennsylvania
Concrete bridges in the United States
Arch bridges in the United States